Radu Albot and Denys Molchanov were the defending champions; however, Molchanov chose not to compete.
Albot teamed up with Oleksandr Nedovyesov but lost in the final to Andreas Beck and Dominik Meffert 7–5, 3–6, [8–10].

Seeds

Draw

Draw

References
 Main Draw

Mersin Cup - Doubles
2013 Doubles